Lee Soon-won (born 19 February 1983) is a South Korean actor.

Filmography

Film

TV series

Web series

References

External links 
 
 

1983 births
Living people
21st-century South Korean male actors
South Korean male television actors
South Korean male film actors
South Korean male stage actors
Cheongju University alumni